Megarthrus is a genus of beetles belonging to the family Staphylinidae.

The genus has almost cosmopolitan distribution.

Species:
 Megarthrus abessinus Bernhauer, 1931
 Megarthrus adelphus Bierig, 1940
 Megarthrus africanus Eichelbaum, 1913
 Megarthrus aino Cuccodoro, 1996
 Megarthrus alatorreorum Rodríguez & Navarrete-Heredia, 2015
 Megarthrus alesi Cuccodoro, 2003
 Megarthrus alienus Cuccodoro, 1998
 Megarthrus alticola Cameron, 1924
 Megarthrus altivagans Bernhauer, 1929
 Megarthrus americanus Sachse, 1852
 Megarthrus andinus López-García, Méndez-Rojas & Navarrete-Heredia, 2011
 Megarthrus anggiensis Cuccodoro, 1998
 Megarthrus angulicollis Mäklin, 1852
 Megarthrus antennalis Cameron, 1941
 Megarthrus apicicornis Cameron, 1950
 Megarthrus arcuatus Hatch, 1957
 Megarthrus ashei Cuccodoro & Löbl, 1996
 Megarthrus atratus Mäklin, 1852
 Megarthrus auricola Cuccodoro, 1995
 Megarthrus balensis Cuccodoro, 1999
 Megarthrus baliemensis Cuccodoro, 1998
 Megarthrus bantu Cuccodoro & Löbl, 1995
 Megarthrus basicornis Fauvel, 1904
 Megarthrus basilewskyi Fagel, 1957
 Megarthrus bellevoyei Saulcy, 1862
 Megarthrus bierigi Cuccodoro, 2011
 Megarthrus bimaculatus Fauvel, 1904
 Megarthrus birmanus Fauvel, 1895
 Megarthrus borealis Cuccodoro & Löbl, 1996
 Megarthrus budai Liu & Cuccodoro, 2020
 Megarthrus calcaratus Coiffait, 1977
 Megarthrus cavianae Rodriguez, Navarrete-Heredia & Arriaga-Varela, 2020
 Megarthrus chiapas Rodríguez, Navarrete-Heredia, Arriaga-Varela & Cuccodoro, 2020
 Megarthrus chinese Li & Jingke, 1993
 Megarthrus chobauti Fauvel, 1902
 Megarthrus chujiao Liu & Cuccodoro, 2020
 Megarthrus clarkei Cuccodoro & Löbl, 1995
 Megarthrus con Cuccodoro, 2011
 Megarthrus conformis K.Sawada, 1962
 Megarthrus congoensis Cameron, 1950
 Megarthrus conspirator Cuccodoro, 1996
 Megarthrus constrictus Cuccodoro, 1996
 Megarthrus convexus Sharp, 1874
 Megarthrus coreanus Kim, Myoung Hee & Cuccodoro, 2011
 Megarthrus corticalis Sharp, 1889
 Megarthrus danieli Cuccodoro, 1999
 Megarthrus dentatus Coiffait, 1977
 Megarthrus denticollis (Beck, 1817)
 Megarthrus dentipes Bernhauer, 1938
 Megarthrus depressus (Paykull, 1789)
 Megarthrus dissymetricus Coiffait, 1977
 Megarthrus dominicae Cuccodoro & Löbl, 1995
 Megarthrus elevatus Coiffait, 1977
 Megarthrus excisus J.L.LeConte, 1863
 Megarthrus fakir Cuccodoro, 2003
 Megarthrus falasha Cuccodoro & Löbl, 1995
 Megarthrus fennicus Lahtinen, 1938
 Megarthrus festivus Cuccodoro, 2011
 Megarthrus fijianus Cuccodoro, 1998
 Megarthrus flavolimbatus Cameron, 1924
 Megarthrus flavosignatus Bierig, 1940
 Megarthrus geginati Cuccodoro, 2010
 Megarthrus gigas Fagel, 1957
 Megarthrus globulus Cuccodoro, 2011
 Megarthrus gressitti Cuccodoro, 1998
 Megarthrus harennaensis Cuccodoro, 1999
 Megarthrus heise Zhang, Cuccodoro, Chen & Liu, 2021
 Megarthrus hemipterus (Illiger, 1794)
 Megarthrus horticola Cuccodoro & Löbl, 1995
 Megarthrus hutu Cuccodoro & Löbl, 1995
 Megarthrus impressicollis Eppelsheim, 1893
 Megarthrus inaequalis Bierig, 1940
 Megarthrus incubifer Cuccodoro, 1996
 Megarthrus integricollis Coiffait, 1977
 Megarthrus ivani Cuccodoro, 2003
 Megarthrus japonicus Sharp, 1874
 Megarthrus kamerunensis Bernhauer, 1942
 Megarthrus kurbatovi Cuccodoro, 2018
 Megarthrus kuscheli Cuccodoro, 1998
 Megarthrus lanka Cuccodoro & Zhiping Liu, 2016
 Megarthrus lisae Cuccodoro, 2011
 Megarthrus loebli Cuccodoro, 2018
 Megarthrus longicornis Wollaston, 1854
 Megarthrus machu Cuccodoro, 2011
 Megarthrus magnicaudatus Cuccodoro & Löbl, 1995
 Megarthrus magnificus Cuccodoro, 2011
 Megarthrus mahnerti Cuccodoro & Löbl, 1995
 Megarthrus major Cuccodoro & Löbl, 1995
 Megarthrus malaisei Scheerpeltz, 1965
 Megarthrus mammiger Bierig, 1940
 Megarthrus maniwaata Cuccodoro & Löbl, 1995
 Megarthrus maronitus Fagel, 1968
 Megarthrus martensi Coiffait, 1982
 Megarthrus mastiger Bierig, 1940
 Megarthrus merabet Cuccodoro & Löbl, 1995
 Megarthrus metanas Cuccodoro, 2011
 Megarthrus minor Coiffait, 1977
 Megarthrus mirabilis Cuccodoro, 2011
 Megarthrus montanus K.Sawada, 1962
 Megarthrus monticola Cameron, 1942
 Megarthrus mukankundiyeorum Cuccodoro & Löbl, 1995
 Megarthrus mwami Cuccodoro & Löbl, 1995
 Megarthrus nanus Cuccodoro & Löbl, 1995
 Megarthrus narendrani Cuccodoro & Zhiping Liu, 2016
 Megarthrus negus Cuccodoro & Löbl, 1995
 Megarthrus newtoni Cuccodoro & Löbl, 1996
 Megarthrus nigerrima Cameron, 1941
 Megarthrus nigrinus J.Sahlberg, 1876
 Megarthrus nilgiriensis Cuccodoro & Zhiping Liu, 2016
 Megarthrus niloticus Cuccodoro & Löbl, 1995
 Megarthrus nitidulus Kraatz, 1857
 Megarthrus notabilis Cameron, 1941
 Megarthrus occidentalis Cuccodoro & Löbl, 1996
 Megarthrus octopus Cuccodoro, 2011
 Megarthrus ogloblini Bruch, 1940
 Megarthrus oromo Cuccodoro, 1999
 Megarthrus ovalis Cameron, 1950
 Megarthrus panga Cuccodoro & Löbl, 1995
 Megarthrus parallelus Sharp, 1874
 Megarthrus pecki Cuccodoro & Löbl, 1996
 Megarthrus peckorum Cuccodoro, 1998
 Megarthrus phoenix Cuccodoro, 2011
 Megarthrus pictus Motschulsky, 1845
 Megarthrus ping Cuccodoro, 2011
 Megarthrus primus Cuccodoro, 1995
 Megarthrus prosseni Schatzmayr, 1904
 Megarthrus ras Cuccodoro & Löbl, 1995
 Megarthrus riedeli Cuccodoro, 1998
 Megarthrus rougemonti Cuccodoro & Löbl, 1995
 Megarthrus rufomarginatus Cameron, 1914
 Megarthrus saddu Cuccodoro, 2003
 Megarthrus sawadai Cuccodoro, 1996
 Megarthrus scotti Cuccodoro & Löbl, 1995
 Megarthrus scriptus Sharp, 1889
 Megarthrus sculpticollis Coiffait, 1982
 Megarthrus selenitus Cuccodoro & Löbl, 1995
 Megarthrus septempunctatus Champion, 1925
 Megarthrus serrula Wollaston, 1865
 Megarthrus sexpunctatus Cameron, 1941
 Megarthrus shibatai K.Sawada, 1962
 Megarthrus simienensis Fagel, 1957
 Megarthrus smetanai Cuccodoro & Löbl, 1996
 Megarthrus solitarius Sharp, 1887
 Megarthrus spathuliformis Assing & Wunderle, 1999
 Megarthrus spinosus Cuccodoro & Löbl, 1995
 Megarthrus splendidus Cuccodoro, 2011
 Megarthrus stercorarius Mulsant & Rey, 1878
 Megarthrus strandi Scheerpeltz, 1931
 Megarthrus stylifer Cuccodoro & Löbl, 1995
 Megarthrus sumatrensis Cameron, 1928
 Megarthrus tac Cuccodoro, 2011
 Megarthrus taiwanus Cuccodoro, 2011
 Megarthrus tibialis Coiffait, 1977
 Megarthrus tic Cuccodoro, 2011
 Megarthrus trisinuatus Cameron, 1924
 Megarthrus twa Cuccodoro & Löbl, 1995
 Megarthrus uhligi Cuccodoro & Löbl, 1997
 Megarthrus umbonatus Fauvel, 1895
 Megarthrus vanschuytbroecki Cuccodoro & Löbl, 1995
 Megarthrus vastus Wendeler, 1926
 Megarthrus watutsi Cuccodoro & Löbl, 1995
 Megarthrus wayqecha Pérez, Rodríguez & Asenjo, 2020
 Megarthrus wittei Cameron, 1950
 Megarthrus wollastoni Cuccodoro & Löbl, 1997
 Megarthrus yeti Cuccodoro, 2003
 Megarthrus zekorum Cuccodoro & Löbl, 1997
 Megarthrus zerchei Cuccodoro & Löbl, 1997
 Megarthrus zulu Cuccodoro & Löbl, 1995
 Megarthrus zunilensis Sharp, 1887

References

Staphylinidae
Staphylinidae genera